Saul is an American hard rock band from Sutherland, Iowa, formed in 2007. It was founded by brothers Blake and Zach Bedsaul who began as a cover band titled "Sequoia". They started Saul in 2007. Saul's lineup also includes William McIlravy (bass guitar/vocals) and Myles Clayborne (drums).

History
After many years of playing locally in the American Midwest and nationally in addition to producing EPs Embrace the Rain with drummer, Todd Poland, and The Touching of Parallels with drummer, Adam Chilton, Saul spent most of 2017-2018 focused on producing their fourth EP, Aeons, which debuted in spring 2019. The album's headline track, "Brother", describes the loss of a brother and the emotional rollercoaster that comes with the coping process.

After exposure on the Sirius XM Octane Test Drive in winter 2019, "Brother" became a regular in Octane's rotation. The song was also on Sirius XM Octane's Accelerator show as a recognized up-and-comer. It peaked at number 20 on the Billboard 40.

The band signed to Spinefarm Records. On August 28, 2020, the single “King of Misery” was released to streaming platforms, co-written by David Draiman of Disturbed. The band released their debut album Rise As Equals on October 23, 2020.

Band members

Current members 
Blake Bedsaul – lead vocals (2007-present), bass (2007-2017)
Zach Bedsaul – lead guitar, backup vocals (2007-present)
William McIlravy – bass, backup vocals (2017-present)
Myles Clayborne - drums (2020-present)

Former members 
Todd Poland - drums (2009-2012)
Adam Chilton - drums (2012-2017)
Joe Nichols – drums (2017-2020)

Discography

Studio albums 

Rise as Equals (2020)

EP 
Embrace the Rain (2010)
The Touching of Parallels (2014)
Aeons (2019)

Singles

Promotional Singles

Music videos

References

American hard rock musical groups
Rock music groups from Iowa
Musical quartets